Point Park may refer to:

 Point State Park, in downtown Pittsburgh, Pennsylvania, United States
 Point Park University, a university in Pittsburgh, named after the park